Andoni Vivanco-Guzmán (born 15 October 1990) is a Spanish former professional tennis player.

Born in Getxo, Vivanco-Guzmán competed mostly on the ITF Futures circuit, where he won a total of 18 titles across singles and doubles. He had career best rankings of 408 in singles and 307 in doubles. His only ATP Tour main draw appearance came in doubles at the 2008 Valencia Open.

Vivanco-Guzmán is a former tour coach of Lara Arruabarrena.

ITF Futures titles

Singles: (3)

Doubles: (15)

References

External links
 
 

1990 births
Living people
Spanish male tennis players
Sportspeople from Biscay
Sportspeople from Getxo
Tennis players from the Basque Country (autonomous community)